Chris Patolo (born 23 July 2001) is a professional rugby league footballer who plays as a  for the Canterbury-Bankstown Bulldogs in the NRL.

Background
A local junior from the Bankstown Sports club, he was a member of Canterbury's Harold Matthews and SG Ball sides before progressing through the club’s High-Performance Youth Program and Jersey Flegg side.

Playing career

2021
In round 16 of the 2021 NRL season, Patolo made his debut for Canterbury-Bankstown against the Manly-Warringah Sea Eagles.
Patolo made a total of six appearances for Canterbury in the 2021 NRL season as the club finished last and claimed the Wooden Spoon.

2022
Patolo played a total of 15 matches for Canterbury in the 2022 NRL season as the club finished 12th on the table.

References

External links
Canterbury Bulldogs profile

2001 births
Living people
Australian sportspeople of Samoan descent
Australian rugby league players
Canterbury-Bankstown Bulldogs players
Rugby league players from Sydney
Rugby league props